Whitaker Street is a prominent street  in Savannah, Georgia, United States. Its directional flow is one-way (southbound). The street is named for Benjamin Whitaker, surveyor general of South Carolina. 

Its northern section passes through the Savannah Historic District, a National Historic Landmark District.

Whitaker Street runs beside ten squares. From north to south:

To the west of
Johnson Square
Wright Square
Chippewa Square
Madison Square
Monterey Square

To the east of
Ellis Square
Telfair Square 
Orleans Square 
Pulaski Square
Chatham Square

It also forms the western boundary of Forsyth Park.

Notable buildings and structures

Below is a selection of notable buildings and structures on Whitaker Street, all in Savannah's Historic District. From north to south:

Savannah Morning News Building, 5 Whitaker Street (1875)
37 Whitaker Street (1890)
116 Whitaker Street (1866)
144–152 Whitaker Street (1898)
Benjamin Purse Property, 311 Whitaker Street (1885)
Julia Tucker Property, 333–335 Whitaker Street (1852)
339 Whitaker Street (1910)
Frederick Kuck Property, 411–417 Whitaker Street (1899)
422 Whitaker Street (1880)
W. B. Hodgson Hall, 501 Whitaker Street (1876)
Magnolia Hall, 503 Whitaker Street (1883)
John Williamson House, 509 Whitaker Street (1870)
Metts–McNeil House, 513 Whitaker Street (1903)
601 Whitaker Street (1883)
603 Whitaker Street (1888)
605 Whitaker Street (1886)
William Holt House, 609 Whitaker Street (1886)
611 Whitaker Street (1894)
Joseph Chestnut House, 701 Whitaker Street (1892)
703 Whitaker Street (1890)
705 Whitaker Street (1900)

References

Roads in Savannah, Georgia
Streets in Georgia (U.S. state)